Nicola Jane Watson (born 10 July 1955) is a Zimbabwean accountant and politician serving as the Member of the National Assembly of Zimbabwe for Bulawayo Central since  2018. She was previously one of the women parliamentary representatives elected in 2013.

Biography

Nicola Watson was born on 10 July 1955 in Bulawayo, Matabeleland in what was then Southern Rhodesia. She attended Hillside Primary School and then Townsend Secondary School. She received her tertiary education at the University of Cape Town. Her mother served as an MP.

Watson joined the Movement for Democratic Change in 2000.

In 2013, she became one of the designated women MPs elected through proportional representation. She was elected the MP for Bulawayo Central in 2018.

References

Living people
1955 births
21st-century Zimbabwean politicians
Members of the National Assembly of Zimbabwe
Movement for Democratic Change – Tsvangirai politicians
People from Bulawayo
University of Cape Town alumni
White Rhodesian people
White Zimbabwean politicians
21st-century Zimbabwean women politicians